Bunge may refer to:

 Bunge (surname)
 Bunge Land, one of the New Siberian Islands
 Bunge y Born, an agribusiness company, now known as Bunge Limited
 Bunge Limited, an agribusiness company
 The unicameral National Assembly in the Tanzanian legislature
 A modifiable avatar stat in GunBound
 Bunge, Gotland, a settlement on Gotland island, Sweden

See also 
 Bung (disambiguation)
 Bungee (disambiguation)